Sannie is both a given name and a surname. Notable people with the name include:

 Mohammed Sannie (born 1986), Ghanaian footballer
 Sannie Overly (born 1966), American lawyer, engineer, and politician

See also
 Nannie